Norrby may refer to 
Norrby, Estonia, a village in western Estonia
Norrby Church in Sweden
Norrby IF, a Swedish football club from Borås
Samuel Norrby (1906–1955), Swedish shot putter
Norrbys, Gotland, a cultural reserve in Sweden